Martin Brian Pritchard (born 16 July 1959) is an Australian politician. He was born in Lymington in England, and arrived in Western Australia in 1967. He has been a Labor member of the Western Australian Legislative Council for North Metropolitan since 21 April 2015, when he was elected in a countback following Ljiljanna Ravlich's resignation.

References

1959 births
Living people
Australian Labor Party members of the Parliament of Western Australia
Members of the Western Australian Legislative Council
English emigrants to Australia
People from Lymington
21st-century Australian politicians